Alexandr Yevgenevych Ananchenko (born 2 February 1966) is a politician who served as Prime Minister of the Donetsk People's Republic from 2018 until 2022, when he resigned from his post.

Biography
Ananchenko was born in 2 February 1966 in Selydove, Donetsk, Ukraine. He has Ukrainian citizenship and a higher education. He was director of the branch of a company belonging to the oligarch Serhiy Kurchenko in the town of Krivets (Kursk Oblast, Russia), as well as his advisor. Since 2013, he lived in eastern Ukraine, where in 2014 he collaborated with Russian forces that invaded the Donbas region. On September 7, 2018, the acting Head of the Donetsk People's Republic (DPR) terrorist organization, Denis Pushilin, appointed him deputy prime minister.

In April 2022, in response to the Russian invasion of Ukraine, Ananchenko was added to the European Union sanctions list "in response to the ongoing unjustified and unprovoked Russian military aggression against Ukraine and other actions undermining or threatening the territorial integrity, sovereignty and independence of Ukraine". On 8 June 2022 he resigned, leading to the dismissal of the DPR government.

References

1966 births
Living people
People from Donetsk Oblast
People of the Donetsk People's Republic
Yaroslav Mudryi National Law University alumni
Pro-Russian people of the war in Donbas
Russian individuals subject to European Union sanctions
Ukrainian collaborators with Russia
Members of the Federation Council of Russia (after 2000)